Mashhadi Mirza Kandi (also Romanized as Mashhadī Mīrzā Kandī; also known as Mīrzā Kandī) is a village in Zangebar Rural District, in the Central District of Poldasht County, West Azerbaijan Province, Iran. At the 2006 census, its population was 836, in 194 families.

References 

Populated places in Poldasht County